Hot R&B/Hip-Hop Songs is a chart published by Billboard that ranks the top-performing songs in the United States in African-American-oriented musical genres; the chart has undergone various name changes since its launch in 1942 to reflect the evolution of such genres.  In 1971, it was published under the title Best Selling Soul Singles.  During that year, 21 different singles topped the chart, based on playlists submitted by radio stations and surveys of retail sales outlets.

In the issue of Billboard dated January 2, King Floyd reached number one with "Groove Me", displacing the final number one of 1970, "Stoned Love" by the Supremes.  It held the top spot for three weeks, was replaced for a single week by "If I Were Your Woman" by Gladys Knight & the Pips, then returned to number one for one further week.  "Groove Me" was Floyd's first number one but would prove to be his only single to reach the top spot.  It was replaced at number one by "(Do The) Push and Pull (Part 1)" by Rufus Thomas, another first-time chart-topper.  Thomas had first recorded in 1941, but did not reach his commercial peak until the early 1970s, when he was well into his 50s; as with Floyd, his 1971 number one would prove to be his only chart-topping single.  Honey Cone, Jean Knight, Denise LaSalle, the Persuaders, and the Chi-Lites also reached number one in 1971 for the first time in their respective careers.

Two singles tied for the year's longest-running number one, both spending five weeks atop the chart.  In March and April, Marvin Gaye spent five weeks at number one with "What's Going On" and Jean Knight achieved the same feat in July and August with "Mr. Big Stuff".  Gaye had the highest cumulative total number of weeks atop the chart of any act in 1971, spending a total of nine weeks in the top spot with "What's Going On", "Mercy Mercy Me (The Ecology)" and "Inner City Blues (Make Me Wanna Holler)".  All three tracks were taken from the album What's Going On, a politically-charged concept album which has been regarded by many critics as one of the greatest albums of all time.  Three other acts achieved more than one number one in 1971: James Brown, Aretha Franklin, and Honey Cone.  The year's final soul number one was "Family Affair" by Sly and the Family Stone, which reached number one in the issue of Billboard dated December 4 and stayed there for the remainder of the year.  It was one of three of 1971's number ones to also top the all-genre Hot 100 chart, along with "Just My Imagination (Running Away with Me)" by the Temptations and Honey Cone's "Want Ads".

Chart history

References

1971
1971 record charts
1971 in American music